Sulden is a mountain village in South Tyrol, northern Italy. It is a frazione of the comune of Stilfs.

Geography
Sulden lies at the foot of the Ortler, in the Vinschgau valley east of the Stelvio Pass. It is 1900 m above sea level, with a population of 400.

History
Due to its remote location, in AD 1802, the Austrian newspaper "Innsbrucker Wochenblatt" compared it to "Siberia of Tyrol", "where farmers dine with bears and kids ride on wolves".

Tourism changed this, as Sulden now has 2000 beds and eleven skilifts, part of Ortler Skiarena.

Famous residents
Reinhold Messner owns a herd of yaks there, and also the Ortler branch of the Messner Mountain Museum.

Notes and references

External links 
Sulden
Sulden, Ortler
Sulden InFo - Webportal Sulden
Ortler SKIARENA

Frazioni of South Tyrol